Poecilioidea is a superfamily of killifish, one of the four superfamilies which make up the suborder Cyprinodontoidei, which is in turn one of the two constituent suborders of the order Cyprinodontiformes. They are found in mainly in the Neotropics north into southern North America with a few species in Africa.

Families
There are two families with in the superfamily Poecilioidea:

 Anablepidae Bonaparte, 1831
 Poeciliidae Bonaparte, 1831

References

Cyprinodontiformes
Taxa named by Lynne R. Parenti